Kurt Cobain: About a Son is a 2006 American documentary film about American rock musician Kurt Cobain, directed by AJ Schnack and produced by Sidetrack Films. It consists of excerpts from the audio recordings journalist Michael Azerrad made of the interviews he conducted with Cobain for the book Come as You Are: The Story of Nirvana, set over ambient cinematography of the places in Washington where Cobain lived, played and worked: Aberdeen, Olympia, and Seattle.

The film debuted at the 2006 Toronto International Film Festival and played at numerous other film festivals, and it was nominated for the Truer Than Fiction Award at the 22nd Independent Spirit Awards. The DVD release of the film, which was released by Shout! Factory in February 2008, includes interviews with and commentary by Azerrad and Schnack. Shout! Factory also released the film on Blu-ray on October 6, 2009.

Soundtrack
Steve Fisk & Benjamin Gibbard – Overture
"Motorcycle Song" – Arlo Guthrie
"It's Late" – Queen
"Downed" – Cheap Trick
"Eye Flys" – Melvins
Audio: Punk Rock
"My Family's a Little Weird" – MDC
"Banned in D.C." – Bad Brains
"Up Around the Bend" – Creedence Clearwater Revival
"Kerosene" – Big Black
"Put Some Sugar on It" – Half Japanese
"Include Me Out" – Young Marble Giants
"Round Two" – Pasties
"Son of a Gun" – The Vaselines
"Graveyard" – Butthole Surfers
Audio: Hardcore Was Dead
"Owner's Lament" – Scratch Acid
"Iris" – The Breeders
"Touch Me I'm Sick" – Mudhoney
Audio: Car Radio
"The Passenger" – Iggy Pop
"Star Sign" – Teenage Fanclub
"The Bourgeois Blues" – Lead Belly
"New Orleans Instrumental No. 1" – R.E.M.
Audio: The Limelight
"The Man Who Sold the World" – David Bowie
"Museum" – Mark Lanegan
"Indian Summer" – Ben Gibbard

Accolades 
 Best Documentary – 2007 San Diego Film Festival

References

External links

 
 
 
 

2006 films
Documentary films about singers
Films about Kurt Cobain
2006 documentary films
American documentary films
2000s English-language films
2000s American films